Brebach may refer to:
 Brebach (Spreeler Bach), a river of North Rhine-Westphalia, Germany
 Brebach, a former municipality, today part of Saarbrücken, Germany